Liliw, officially the Municipality of Liliw,  is a 4th class municipality in the province of Laguna, Philippines. According to the 2020 census, it has a population of 39,491 people.

It is one of the highland towns forming the southern extremity of Laguna. It is situated at the foot of Mt. Banahaw.

It is bounded on the north-west by Santa Cruz; north-east by Magdalena; on the east by Majayjay; on the west by Nagcarlan; and on the south by Dolores, Quezon.

Liliw is perhaps best known for its cold water spring resorts, native homemade sweets and a sizeable shoe industry that rivals that of Marikina. The town is also known for its baroque church and its Liliw-style houses. 

The local government is currently undertaking means to conserve its cultural heritage sites and has proposed to enact a legislation that would mandate the usage of the Liliwstyle architecture as the only means of construction and re-construction in the town. If the ordinance passes, Liliw will have a greater chance to become a heritage town, and further support from the National Commission for Culture and the Arts.

History

According to a story, Liliw got its name from a bird. It was said that Gat Tayaw and his followers decided to erect a bamboo pole and to name the town after the bird that would first alight at the top of the pole within four days. A crow, however, was the first bird to alight on the pole. A crow was considered bad and so Gat Tayaw and his men moved south and erected another bamboo pole. A beautiful bird alighted on the pole and sang, "Liw, Liw, Liw". Thus the town became Liliw.

This is supported by first Tagalog dictionary written by Fr. San Buenaventura in 1613, under the dictionary entry 'lilio' stating "a type of bird, from which the town in Laguna under the Franciscan monks is named after."

The spelling of the town's name from Lilio was changed on June 11, 1965, when the municipal council passed Resolution No. 38-S-65 which declared “Liliw” as the official name and spelling of the town. This was to avoid confusion in pronouncing and spelling the name of the town.

Geography

Barangays
Liliw is politically subdivided into 33 barangays.

 Bagong Anyo (Poblacion)
 Bayate
 Bongkol
 Bubukal
 Cabuyew
 Calumpang
 San Isidro
 Culoy
 Dagatan
 Daniw
 Dita
 Ibabang Palina
 Ibabang San Roque
 Ibabang Sungi
 Ibabang Taykin
 Ilayang Palina
 Ilayang San Roque
 Ilayang Sungi
 Ilayang Taykin
 Kanlurang Bukal
 Laguan
 Luquin
 Malabo-Kalantukan
 Masikap (Poblacion)
 Maslun (Poblacion)
 Mojon
 Novaliches
 Oples
 Pag-asa (Poblacion)
 Palayan
 Rizal (Poblacion)
 San Isidro
 Silangang Bukal
 Tuy-Baanan

Climate

Demographics

Economy

Transportation
Tricycles and jeepneys  are popular modes of transportation in Liliw. Buses are available to Santa Cruz, Calamba, and Metro Manila.

How to get there
Liliw is 110 kilometers from Manila via Santa Cruz and 105 kilometers via San Pablo.

For those taking public transport, there are buses in Cubao in Quezon City, Buendia in Makati/Pasay, and Alabang in Muntinlupa going to either Santa Cruz or San Pablo. Travel time from Manila is about two hours. Upon arriving in either Santa Cruz or San Pablo, take a jeepney going to Liliw.

Those bringing private vehicles have several options. The trip to Liliw can be combined with Nagcarlan and Majayjay using the San Pablo route or with Pagsanjan and Lake Caliraya using the Santa Cruz route. If it's summer, avoid the Santa Cruz route as traffic at the Pansol area can become horrible.

The route via San Pablo starts in Manila, enters South Luzon Expressway and exits from Santo Tomas. From there, continue driving to Alaminos town, then enter city of San Pablo, turn left to Rizal, continue driving via Nagcarlan before finally arriving in Liliw.

Liliw is known for its baroque style church whose façade is made of striking red bricks. Known as St. John the Baptist church, its first church was built in wood in 1620. The stronger stone church was built from 1643 to 1646. The present church patio has been developed to promote Catholic teachings. Standing in front of the church are several elevated statues of different saints that are patrons of each of the town's barangays (villages).

Standing next to the municipal hall is the statue of Gat Tayaw. On Gat Tayaw and P. Burgos streets still stand the ancestral houses of many of Liliw's prominent families who got rich during the American time from agricultural products like copra, lanzones, banana, and vegetables like tomatoes and mustasa.

Liliw also has many natural attractions like the Kilangin Falls and the colds springs of Batis ng Liliw and Liliw Resort.

But the town's main attraction is its growing footwear industry. It started in 1931 when Casiano Pisuena became interested in making slippers. His first prototype was made from coconut husk and rubber from tire interiors. He soon became successful and many residents of Liliw followed suit. At present there are about 50 stores selling footwear in Liliw. The regular slippers are still the most popular, but many stores are now selling shoes, handbags and other leather goods. Most stores still carry the three-for-P100 slippers. The annual Tsinelas Festival is celebrated every end of April.

Gallery

References

External links

[ Philippine Standard Geographic Code]
1995 Philippine Census Information
Philippine Census Information
Local Governance Performance Management System

Municipalities of Laguna (province)
Populated places established in 1571
1571 establishments in the Philippines